Manuel Inocêncio Sousa (born 22 June 1951) is a Cape Verdean politician. Sousa was Minister of Foreign Affairs of Cape Verde from 2001 to 2002 and subsequently Minister of Infrastructure, Transports and Sea.

Biography
Manuel Inocêncio Sousa was born in Mindelo on the island of São Vicente.

He became a member of PAICV in 1988 in the government of the African Party for the Independence of Cape Verde (PAICV). From 1991 to 2001, he was deputy of the National Assembly. Afterwards he was Foreign Minister of Cape Verde from 2001 to 2002 he succeeded Rui Alberto de Figueiredo Soares and was succeeded by Fátima Veiga. He stood unsuccessfully as the PAICV's candidate in the 2011 presidential election on March 12,  In the first round on August 7, he was second with 32.47% behind Fonseca with 37.76% and head of Lima by 27.8%, in the second round, he lost to Fonseca with 45.84% of the vote.

References

1951 births
Living people
Foreign ministers of Cape Verde
People from Mindelo